3rd Regiment of Dragoons may refer to:

3rd Dragoon Guards
3rd The King's Own Hussars, formerly known as 3rd (The King's Own) Regiment of (Light) Dragoons
3rd Dragoon Regiment (France)
3rd Continental Light Dragoons
3rd U.S. Dragoons